Ángel Velasco Marugán (born 16 May 1986), commonly known as Lin, is a Spanish futsal player who plays for Real Betis as an winger.

Honours
3 Spanish futsal leagues (04/05, 10/11, 11/12)
3 Copa de España (2011, 2012, 2013)
1 Copa del Rey (2011)
2 UEFA Futsal Cup (2012, 2014) 
1 Copa Intercontinental (2005)
3 Futsal Euro (2010, 2012, 2016)
1 Campeonato de España de Selecciones Sub-18
1 Subcampeonato juvenil de clubes de España (04/05)

External links
LNFS profile
RFEF profile
UEFA profile

1986 births
Living people
People from Segovia
Sportspeople from the Province of Segovia
Spanish men's futsal players
Inter FS players
Caja Segovia FS players
FC Barcelona Futsal players